Autopista del Sol may refer to:

Autopista del Sol (Chile), a road in Santiago, Chile
Mexican Federal Highway 95D, known as Autopista del Sol from Cuernavaca to Acapulco